Archilochus is a genus of hummingbirds. It consists of two small  migratory species which breed in North America and winter in Central America, Mexico and the southern United States.

The genus Archilochus was introduced in 1854 by the German naturalist Ludwig Reichenbach with the black-chinned hummingbird as the type species. The name Archilochus is that of a Greek lyric poet from the island of Paros who lived around 650 BC. Two species are placed in the genus.

References 

 
Bird genera
Taxa named by Ludwig Reichenbach